Hypochra albipennis is a species of ulidiid or picture-winged fly in the genus Hypochra of the family Ulidiidae.

They have been observed in and around Oslo.

References

Ulidiidae
Insects described in 1846